Olof Erland Persson (born June 22, 1964) was the president of AB Volvo and CEO of the Volvo Group until April 22, 2015, having been in the role since September 1, 2011. He has also been a member of the board since September 1, 2011 and a member of the Volvo Group executive team since 2006. In addition to these duties, he is also the chairman of the board of the German-Swedish Chamber of Commerce.

Education

Born and raised in Sweden, Persson went on to study at Karlstad University where he graduated with a Bachelor of Science in business administration and economics.

Career

Olof Persson began his career at ABB in 1988 and, among other assignments, held a number of executive positions at AdTranz and Daimler-Chrysler.

In 2004, he was appointed the president of the mainline and metros division of Bombardier Inc., where he remained until 2006, when he was offered the job as president and CEO of Volvo Aero. In 2008, Persson was made the president and CEO of Volvo Construction Equipment in Brussels, until his appointment as president of the entire group in 2011 until April 22, 2015, when he was replaced by Martin Lundstedt.

References

External links

Olof Persson, Volvo Group 

1964 births
Swedish chief executives
Karlstad University alumni
Living people